Sebastián Contreras (born 5 April 1990) is an Argentine professional footballer who plays as a midfielder. He is currently free agent.

References

External links

MASL2 stats
NISA stats

1990 births
Living people
Argentine footballers
Association football midfielders
Argentine expatriate footballers
Expatriate soccer players in the United States
Argentine expatriate sportspeople in the United States
USL Championship players
Atlético Venezuela C.F. players
UAI Urquiza players
Metropolitanos FC players
Trujillanos FC players
Zamora FC players
Defensores Unidos footballers
El Paso Locomotive FC players
Union Omaha players
USL League One players
National Independent Soccer Association players